Perdiccas (Greek: Περδίκκας; died 321 BC) was a commander under Eumenes in the war against Antigonus in 321 BC. He was preparing to desert to the enemy when Eumenes became apprised of his project and sent Phoenix of Tenedos against him, who surprised his camp in the night, took him prisoner and brought him before Eumenes, who had him put to death.

Notes

References
 Smith, William (editor); Dictionary of Greek and Roman Biography and Mythology, "Perdiccas (2)", Boston, (1867)
 

Ancient Macedonian generals
4th-century BC Macedonians
321 BC deaths
Year of birth unknown